Vallabhbhai Vasrambhai Marvaniya is an Indian farmer from Khamdhrol village of Junagadh district of Gujarat. He is known for introducing carrots for Gujaratis. In 2019, he was awarded Padma Shri, India's fourth-highest civilian award. In 2017, he also received a National Award from the President of India at Rashtrapati Bhavan. Marvaniya is also the recipient of the ninth National Grassroots Innovation Awards in 2017 for his innovation.

References 

Living people
Recipients of the Padma Shri
Year of birth missing (living people)
Indian farmers
People from Junagadh district